Ira Vail (22 November 1893  – 21 April 1979) was a Canadian-American racecar driver and auto racing promoter. He was born in Montreal, Quebec, Canada.

Career

Vail raced sprint and championship cars in the AAA-sanctioned racing series. He competed in five Indianapolis 500s, with a best finish of 7th in 1921, before retiring in 1925.

In a quote about his career for a book, Vail stated:

""The car I drove, I bought it from Harry Miller for $10,000. That's what they all cost, a Miller or a Duesenberg, from $8,000-$10,000, which was a lot of money at a time when a good passenger car cost only $1,000. But you could win $30,000 or more at Indianapolis and as much as $5,000 at a cement track in Minneapolis or tracks in Hartford, Boston, everywhere. You'd be guaranteed (cash) even if you didn't win, depending on the deal you made with the promoter. It depended on how many people you could draw. I got guarantees at most tracks and I'd drive at 15 or 20 tracks a year."

After his retirement from driving, Ira Vail promoted AAA and USAC sanctioned auto racing in the Northeastern United States. From 1925 until 1971 Vail promoted the New York State Fair Championship race at the Syracuse Mile. He nicknamed the race track "The Moody Mile" after driver Wes Moody turned a 100-mile per hour lap in 1970.

Vail died in Daytona Beach, Florida.

Award
Vail was inducted in the National Sprint Car Hall of Fame in the United States in 1993.

Indy 500 results

See also
List of Canadians in Champ Car

References

American racing drivers
Indianapolis 500 drivers
National Sprint Car Hall of Fame inductees
Racing drivers from Quebec
Sportspeople from Montreal
1893 births
1979 deaths
AAA Championship Car drivers
Canadian emigrants to the United States